The solar apex, or the apex of the Sun's way, refers to the direction that the Sun travels with respect to the local standard of rest. This is not to be confused with the Sun's apparent motion through all constellations of the zodiac, which is an illusion caused by the orbit of the Earth.

Direction
The solar apex is in the constellation of Hercules, southwest of Vega, northeast of his "outstretched arm", Omicron Herculis. There are two mainstream sets of coordinates for the solar apex.  
The visual coordinates (as obtained by visual observation of the apparent motion) are right ascension (RA) , declination (dec) 30° N
in galactic coordinates: 56.24° longitude, +22.54° latitude
in ecliptic coordinates: 271.79° longitude, +53.43° latitude.

The radioastronomical position is RA , dec + (galactic coordinates: 58.87° longitude, 17.72° latitude). 

Evaluation of movement of the Solar System in its neighborhood is complex; a selection of links is on the Talk page of this article.

For more than 30 years before 1986 the speed of the Sun towards the solar apex was taken to be about 20 km/s but all later studies give a smaller component in the vector toward galactic longitude 90°, reducing overall speed to about 13.4 km/s. This speed is not to be confused with the orbital speed of the Sun around the Galactic Center, which is about 220 km/s and is included in the movement of the Local standard of rest. Thus the Sun moves towards the apex (a relatively local point) at about  our spiral arm's orbital speed. The Sun's motion in the Milky Way is not confined to the galactic plane; it also shifts ("bobs") up and down with respect to the plane over millions of years.

History
The nature and extent of the solar motion was first demonstrated by William Herschel in 1783, who also first determined the direction for the solar apex, as Lambda Herculis, 10° away from today's accepted position.

Solar antapex 
The solar antapex, the direction opposite of the solar apex, is located near the star Zeta Canis Majoris.

Gallery

See also 
 Manuel Foster Observatory – southern observatory established for the determination of the Solar Apex by W. W. Campbell

References

Dynamics of the Solar System